Greater Manchester Police (GMP) is the territorial police force responsible for law enforcement within the metropolitan county of Greater Manchester in North West England. 

, Greater Manchester Police employed 6,866 police officers, 3,524 members of police staff, and 560 police community support officers. Additionally, the force has 325 special constables. GMP is headquartered at  Central Park, Northampton Road, Newton Heath, Manchester.

In December 2020, GMP was placed into special measures by Her Majesty's Inspectorate of Constabulary and Fire & Rescue Services (HMICFRS), this was following the watchdog's report found that GMP did not record one in five crimes between July 2019 and June 2020. They estimated the force failed to log around 80,100 crimes, a high proportion of which were violent offences. Following the announcement, Chief Constable Ian Hopkins, resigned from his post.

History

Greater Manchester Police was directly created from two recently amalgamated city police forces, Manchester and Salford Police and parts of what were Lancashire Constabulary, Cheshire Constabulary and West Yorkshire Constabulary on 1 April 1974. The city forces were Manchester Borough Police, which formed in the late 1830s and Salford Borough Police, which began in 1844. Upon Manchester gaining city status in 1853, its police force changed its name to Manchester City Police to reflect its status. In 1926, Salford also became a city, resulting in Salford Borough Police becoming Salford City Police. These two city forces operated until 1968 when, as a result of compulsory amalgamation, as per the Police Act 1964, Salford City Police merged with Manchester City Police, resulting in the new force of Manchester and Salford Police. This new force lasted only six years, when in 1974 the Local Government Act 1972 created the Metropolitan County of Greater Manchester and with it, Greater Manchester Police.

Indirectly, GMP can also trace its heritage to a number of other borough forces, each with their own significant history, which had been abolished in the late 1960s (under the Police Act 1964) and which had been amalgamated into the county forces of Lancashire and Cheshire. These two county forces only policed these boroughs for around six years before Greater Manchester was created and GMP took over responsibility for providing police services. In the historic Lancashire county area these borough police forces were Bolton Borough Police (1839-1969), Oldham Borough Police (1849-1969), Rochdale Borough Police (1857-1969) and Wigan Borough Police (1836-1969). In the historic Cheshire county area this included Stockport Borough Police (at least 1835-1967).

The first chief constable of GMP was William James Richards. Richards had been the chief constable of the short lived Manchester and Salford Police (1968 to 1974) and before that chief constable of Manchester City Police (1966 to 1968). Following his retirement on 30 June 1976, James Anderton became the new chief constable on 1 July 1976. 
Anderton was a controversial figure during his 15 years in office due to his outspoken style of leadership and hard-line views on crime, policing and morality.

In 1991, David Wilmot succeeded Anderton. In 2002, Michael J. Todd was appointed to chief constable until his death in 2008.

There was much press coverage of Todd's death in March 2008. Todd was seen as a man of action and got more "bobbies on the beat", with himself often doing so. GMP's assistant chief constable became the acting chief constable until the appointment of Peter Fahy, previously head of Cheshire Police, as chief constable in September 2008.

Police constable Ian Rodgers was the first GMP officer to be killed in the line of duty in 1975. His death occurred in a railway incident at Stockport. Since the formation of GMP, 20 officers have been killed or died in the line of duty. GMP then assisted with the reconstruction of Manchester following the 1996 Manchester bombing.

In the 1990s, Manchester had gained the deriding tag of 'Gunchester', in reference to the city's high gun crime rate at the time. Greater Manchester Police faced the problem of gun crime in Manchester, particularly in the deprived districts in south Manchester. Key gang leaders were jailed for life in 2009. 
By 2011, the city had shaken off the tag.

On 14 October 2010, Greater Manchester Police posted details of all calls made to them in a 24-hour period on Twitter. The service posted details of every incident reported to its officers in 24 hours to demonstrate how much of their time is spent on what the chief constable called "social work" instead of fighting crime. They repeated this exercise on 14 October 2014.

GMP have used social media as a helpful force rather than a hindrance. In the 2011 England riots, with criticism of the role social media such as Twitter and Facebook had in instigating the riots, GMP stated that support on social media had resulted in many responses from members of the public in trying to catch suspects. GMP then naming and shamed any convicted individuals over the riots.

Chief constables
1974–1976 : William James Richards
1976–1991 : Sir James Anderton
1991–2002 : Sir David Wilmot
2002–2008 : Michael J. Todd
2008–2015 : Sir Peter Fahy
2015–2020 : Ian Hopkins
2020–2021 : Ian Pilling (acting)
2021–present : Stephen Watson

Officers killed in the line of duty

The following officers of Greater Manchester Police are listed by the Police Roll of Honour Trust as having died during the course of their duties:
 PC Fiona Bone, 2012 (killed in firearm and grenade attack; cause of death gunshot wound to the chest)
 PC Nicola Hughes, 2012 (killed in firearm and grenade attack; cause of death gunshot wounds)
 PC Christopher Hart, 2010 (Died in a road traffic incident while on duty responding to a 999 call)
 PC Ian Terry, 2008 (shot during a firearms training exercise)
 PC Allan Shaw, 2006 (died as a result of a Motor Cycle RTC during a special escort training exercise)
 DC Stephen Oake, 2003 (stabbed during anti-terrorism operation, posthumously awarded the Queen's Gallantry Medal)
 PC Alison Armitage, 2001 (run over by a car thief)
 PC Raja Bashrat Ahmed, 1999 (Police motorcycle rammed into oncoming traffic by car thief)
 PC Robert Nathans, 1999 (collapsed and died after pursuing a suspect)
 Inspector Raymond Anthony Codling, 1989 (shot while questioning a suspect on car park at Birch Services M62)
 DC John Sandford, 1982 (attacked while investigating reports of an indecent assault)
 PC John Egerton, 1982 (stabbed during an arrest, posthumously awarded Queen's Commendation for Brave Conduct)

Governance

From November 2012 to May 2017, the Greater Manchester Police and Crime Commissioner was Tony Lloyd. The police and crime commissioner was scrutinised by the Greater Manchester Police and Crime Panel, made up of elected councillors from the local authorities in the police area. Before November 2012 the Greater Manchester Police Authority was the police governance. However, under new plans for an elected Mayor of Greater Manchester announced by George Osborne in November 2014, the position of Police and Crime Commissioner was removed and its responsibilities subsumed into the mayoral office. The first Mayoral election took place in 2017, in which Andy Burnham was elected mayor.

Organisation
The area GMP polices is split into geographical divisions, with each Metropolitan borough of Greater Manchester being assigned one. In 2021, GMP grouped some divisions together to form command areas, the divisions that remain on their own are also still referred to as a command area. Each command area is run by a chief superintendent, with each 'division' or 'cluster' being led by a superintendent.

, these are the six command areas:

 South command area (Stockport (J) & Trafford (M) Divisions) 
 East command area (Tameside (G) & Oldham (Q) Divisions) 
 City of Manchester command area (City of Manchester (A) Division)
 Salford command area (Salford (F) Division) 
 North command area (Bury (N) & Rochdale (P) Divisions) 
 West command area (Bolton (K) & Wigan (L) Divisions)

Manchester Airport (I) Division falls within the Specialist Operations branch.

GMP Units

Road Policing Unit

In 2009, the RPU's were divided into three strategic units, based at RPU 1 Leigh, RPU 2 Hyde & RPU 3 Chadderton. Due to the constraints on budgets and the latest review, the Road Policing Unit will lose a further 78 officers and in 2012 restructured/reduced to two RPU's based at Eccles and Chadderton. This has reduced the strength of the RPU to only 100 officers over a 5 shift system providing only 20 officers per shift to cover the police area. 2014 has seen this further reduced to 10-12 officers working the force area per shift as further cuts reduce officer numbers.

During the 1990s, the GMP's area had a high rate of car crime. To combat this the Tactical Vehicle Crime Unit was formed which in 2010 was replaced by Vortex which was based at Stretford Police Station.

In June 2011, The Tactical Vehicle Crime Unit was re formed under the slightly different name, Tactical Vehicle Intercept Unit. The unit continued to utilise a selection of high performance unmarked vehicles and officers worked alongside the ANPR Intercept Unit to combat serious and organised criminals using the road network.

In 2016, the unit merged with firearms, dogs and the Tactical Aid Unit to form the Specialist Operations Branch.

The Roads Policing Unit (RPU) and TVIU often work hand in hand in implementing certain tactics such as Tactical Pursuit and Containment for which the TVIU & RPU are the only departments trained in this field.

Air Support Unit

Aviation support has been provided to the GMP by the National Police Air Service (NPAS) since 2012. NPAS operates a EurocopterEC135 T2+ helicopter call sign NPAS 21 from City Airport Manchester,
which provides support to all neighbouring police forces. 

GMP had formed an Air Support Unit in 1989. GMP's first helicopter was a Eurocopter AS355 Twin Squirrel. In  2001, the GMP was operating a McDonnell Douglas MD 902 Explorer helicopter call sign India 99 which remained in service until 2008. The MD 902 Explorer flew more than 8,000 hours dealing with around 5,500 incidents and was involved in the arrest of more than 700 criminals. In 2008, a new MD Helicopters MD 902 Explorer entered service to replace the older helicopter.

Prior to the establishment of NPAS in 2012, the Air Support Unit had amalgamated with Cheshire Constabulary, North Wales Police and Lancashire Constabulary to form the North West Air Operations Group (NWAOG) in July 2011, operating four helicopters. The group was established to save money and provide flexibility with the closest helicopter able to be deployed to an incident and if there were two incidents in the same force area then two helicopters could be sent if necessary.

The Air Support Unit had also operated a fixed wing aircraft. In January 2002, GMP ordered a Britten-Norman Defender 4000 fixed wing aircraft for the Commonwealth Games in July. In July, GMP began operating the Defender call sign India 66 for the Games which flew on average seven hours a day. The Defender flew around 1,200 hours each year including targeting terrorists and major criminals. The Defender was decommissioned in December 2013. In the United Kingdom, two other police services have also operated the Defender 4000  the Police Service of Northern Ireland and Hampshire Constabulary.

GMP also trialled a tethered blimp in 2010 to provide surveillance for major events and high crime locations. The blimp was only used on 18 occasions and was sold due to operational problems.

Tactical Aid Unit
GMP operates a Tactical Aid Unit which is used in crowd control instances. The service has policed notable riots such as the 2001 Oldham race riots, the 2008 UEFA Cup Final riots and the 2011 England riots which affected Salford and Manchester city centre in 2011.

Serious Crime Division
The SCD is a unit of GMP responsible for dealing with serious crimes and providing protection for vulnerable people.

Counter-terrorism
The GMP Counter Terrorism Unit was formed in April 2007 to prevent the spread of terrorism. The city has experienced incidents with the intention to spread terror, such as the 1996 Manchester Bombing and the Manchester Arena bombing. Most recently, the unit helped thwart the 2009 plot to launch terror attacks on the Trafford Centre, Arndale Centre and nearby St Ann's Square.

Tactical Firearms Unit

Officers of the GMP, as in the rest of Great Britain, do not routinely carry firearms. Instead, the GMP maintains a firearms unit to provide them with a capability to deal with armed criminals. The Greater Manchester Police, Tactical Firearms Unit maintains Armed Response Vehicles, which transport armed officers to the scene.

Dog Unit
In 2003, GMP had over 110 dogs. However, this has recently been reduced to only 35 dogs across the force, leaving many areas without a single dog available. The dogs are involved in important operational duties such as tracking, building searches, and other criminal work across Greater Manchester.

Mounted Unit

The GMP maintains a mounted policing capability. The mounted officers are employed to target crime hotspots and are also seen at many events including demonstrations and the region's football matches. Horses are also used to search inaccessible areas for missing or wanted people. The unit is made up of a team of specialist police officers, skilled grooms and trainers, and 35 horses. The mounted unit is based at Hough End, in Chorlton, and uses horseboxes to transport the horses for duties around Greater Manchester.

Special constabulary
GMP has over 350 special constables, who are assigned to each of the twelve divisions. Special constables work alongside their regular counterparts and are mainly assigned to divisions and work within local policing teams (LPTs), however some divisions still allow officers to work within response teams when LPT's are not on duty. Between 2009 and 2012, a small number of special constables were integrated into the Special Operations Department (X – Depart) working within the Road Policing Units (RPU's), undertaking a full and complete duties within the traffic department.

In addition there are a number of special constables engaged, with support of their employers in the Employee Supported Policing scheme. This is where the officers employer supports the officers duties, usually with paid time, 8 hours per month are commonly covered to undertake their special constabulary duties at their normal place of work.

Special constables are normally co-ordinated by the chief officer of the special constabulary, currently Michael Walmsley, and divisional commanders. Under the guidance of the chief constable, it was envisaged that the number of special constables within GMP would increase to 1,000 officers, within a three-year period from 2009, to date this target has not been achieved.

Video Intelligence Unit

This unit conducts overt surveillance of certain released prisoners and upload some footage onto YouTube of people that they believe have reoffended.

Major Incident Team 
Greater Manchester Police has eight specialist Major Incident syndicates.

Transport Unit 

The Transport Unit was created in November 2019. Its role involves proactively tackling crime and disorder across Greater Manchester's public transport system, including roads, buses, trams and interchanges. The unit consists of 56 police officers, replacing previous initiatives that saw PCSOs patrolling the transport network.

Collaborations
Greater Manchester Police is a partner in the following collaborations:
 North West Police Underwater Search & Marine Unit
 North West Motorway Police Group

Rank structure

The rank structure that the Greater Manchester Police use is the same as all other British territorial police forces, excluding London.

Insignia

The Greater Manchester Police also have a special constabulary with five ranks.

Workforce
These are the numbers of police officers for each rank:

Newspaper
Greater Manchester Police produce its own newspaper, Brief, which is distributed to thousands of officers, making it one of the largest in circulation. Each 20-page issue has a mix of news about police initiatives, policies and crime successes, in-depth articles on specialist units, social and sports news, and regular features.

Funding
In June 2017, less than a month after the Manchester Arena bombing, the Chief Constable of GMP, Ian Hopkins, said the force was under strain due to funding cuts. Mayor of Greater Manchester, Andy Burnham, intended to write to the Prime Minister claiming that the GMP was up to its limits "and probably beyond them". In March 2010 there was a total workforce of 13,189 staff, but projections suggested there would be only 10,108 by 2020. Her Majesty's Inspectorate of Constabulary (HMIC) maintained that the number of police officers would reduce by 1,800 over the next ten years. Burnham feared that pressure on the GMP was increasing due to terrorism and also because of a rise in violent crime in the region. Burnham told The Guardian, "There’s no question about it: GMP needs more officers. They are at their limits, probably beyond them, in terms of what they are dealing with. The chief constable has described it as the low end of reasonable. Therefore, that’s borderline unreasonable."

PEEL inspection
Her Majesty's Inspectorate of Constabulary and Fire & Rescue Services (HMICFRS) conducts a periodic police effectiveness, efficiency and legitimacy (PEEL) inspection of each police service's performance. In its latest PEEL inspection,  was rated as follows:

GMP incidents and investigations
 Moors murders, 1960s – The investigation into the Moors murders was taken up by Cheshire Police. Since the Local Government Act 1972, Saddleworth Moors fall into Greater Manchester jurisdiction. GMP have attempted to search Saddleworth Moors without success to find the fifth victim, Keith Bennett.
 The 1981 Moss Side riot began when 1,000 youths surrounded the police station in Moss Side, smashing all the windows and destroying 12 vehicles. It was followed by 48 hours of rioting.
 Harold Shipman, 1998 – Shipman was a doctor by profession who murdered patients. Shipman's proven victims totalled 218 making him the most prolific serial killer in history. His victim count probably was higher, with 236 believed to be more accurate.
 1996 Manchester bombing, 15 June 1996 – A 3,300 lb bomb was positioned in Manchester city centre on Corporation Street. The bomb was the largest bomb in the United Kingdom since World War II and the IRA admitted responsibility. Officers from Greater Manchester Police, assisted by other emergency services, evacuated over 80,000 people from the immediate vicinity of the bomb, from the first tip-off at approximately 10:00 a.m. to 11:16 a.m. when the bomb exploded. Hundreds were injured, many from shard of glass but there were no fatalities. As of 2012, the perpetrators have not been caught and GMP stated in 1996 that it is unlikely anyone will be charged in relation to the bombing.
 Gun crime in south Manchester, 1995–2009 – Gun crime in south Manchester peaked in 1999 with forty-three gun-related injuries and seven fatalities and continued until the early 2000s. Manchester went a year without a gun related fatality from February 2008 to 2009 for the first time in over a decade. This reduction is attributed to the jailing of eleven members of the Gooch Gang in 2009 and the service operates Xcalibre unit which tackles gang and gun-related crime and violence in Greater Manchester – deterring individuals from joining gangs and prohibiting the availability of firearms. As of 2012, gun crime in south Manchester is now rare.
 In 2001, Ethnic violence led to the Oldham riots, which saw 15 police officers injured and 32 police vehicles destroyed.
 Operation Augusta, from 2003 – Following the death of a 15-year-old orphaned girl while in the care of Manchester social services, the police launched an operation which identified at least 57 children at risk of sexual abuse and up to 97 possible abusers, but which was prematurely closed down; a follow-up Operation Green Jacket, active in 2019, identified 53 potential victims.
 2008 UEFA Cup Final riots (also known as the Battle of Piccadilly) – The 2008 UEFA Cup Final on 14 May 2008. Some Rangers fans instigated scuffles and disorder before the match had started and when the video screen broke during the match, the disorder descended into riots.
 2011 England riots, August 2011 – The riots originally started in London on Saturday 6 August, and in response GMP sent 100 riot police officers on Tuesday 9 August. Riots with opportunist looting broke out in Manchester city centre on the evening of Tuesday 15.
 Shooting of Anthony Grainger on 3 March 2012, an unarmed man was shot and killed by armed police during an operation. in 2017 a Public Inquiry was held. The report into Grainger's death was made public on 11 July 2019 which concluded that Greater Manchester Police were to blame for his death due to their failures.
 Manchester Arena bombing, 22 May 2017 - An explosion occurred at the end of an Ariana Grande concert, killing 22 people, and injuring 59. GMP had a heavy police response, with many general duties officers and specialised firearms officers descending on the scene. The bomb squad responded, doing a controlled demolition on some abandoned clothes.
 GMP Placed into special measures, 18 December 2020 - Greater Manchester Police was placed into special measures following a 'damning inquiry has found one in five crimes were not recorded - and more than 80,000 hadn't been investigated properly'. Following the announcement, the Chief Constable, Ian Hopkins, resigned.

Controversy
In 2003, video evidence emerged documenting racist acts by police trainees and officers, including one member applauding Hitler and another donning a Ku Klux Klan outfit. Flagrant use of racist language to deride other police trainees was also reported.

See also
 Aerial roof markings
 Law enforcement in the United Kingdom
 List of law enforcement agencies in the United Kingdom, Crown Dependencies and British Overseas Territories
 The Force: Manchester - Documentary on the work of GMP

References

External links 

 
 Greater Manchester Police at Her Majesty's Inspectorate of Constabulary and Fire & Rescue Services
 
 
 

Greater Manchester Police
Organizations established in 1974
Police forces of England
Police
1974 establishments in England